The Drususstein (Drusus stone) is a nearly 20 metres high masonry block of Roman origin on the grounds of the citadel of Mainz, Germany. It was originally cased in marble. Researchers now largely accept that this is the structural remnant of the cenotaph mentioned by writers like Eutropius and Suetonius, erected in 9 BC by Roman troops in honour of the deceased general Drusus, in Mogontiacum (now Mainz).

During the early days of the Principate the Drususstein was the starting point for elaborate memorial services in honour of Drusus, and the centre of the imperial cult in Mogontiacum. A procession road linked it to the theatre of Mogontiacum, which contained approximately 12,000 seats, making it the largest known theatre north of the Alps. It may have hosted a part of the annual ceremonies at the day of Drusus' death, and probably also at his birthday.

After being robbed of its marble casing in the early Middle Ages, the Drususstein served as a watchtower in the fortifications of the city in the 16th century. For that purpose a staircase and doorframe were made in the structure, which had been up to that point a solid building. Besides the pillars of aqueducts and the stage of the theatre, the Drususstein is one of the few remaining visible reminders of Roman Mogontiacum. Together with the Igel Column, it is the only funerary monument north of the Alps dating from antiquity that remains in its original location.

Historical background
The Roman general Nero Claudius Drusus, stepson of Augustus, founded the legionary camp of Mogontiacum opposite the mouth of the River Main, no later than 13–12 BC. It was intended to serve as a strategic starting point for the conquest of Magna Germania. During the campaign in 9 BC Drusus died. His brother Tiberius and the Roman army returned his body back to Mogontiacum. Before the transfer of the body to Rome, the soldiers honoured their popular commander with a memorial ceremony. During this time the apparently spontaneous wish arose among the soldiers to erect a monument to permanently honour Drusus in Mogontiacum. Appropriate construction activities were probably already ongoing in the immediate vicinity of the legionary camp, as Augustus approved the project retroactively. As a special tribute to Drusus, Augustus himself wrote a grave inscription (elogium) which was attached to the cenotaph. With this the building was completed.

Fictional references 
The ceremonies at the Drususstein feature as a major plot element in volume 2 of the novel series Romanike.

Gallery

Literature

References

External links 

 Roman Mainz Initiative with information on the Drususstein (in German)
 Archeological Directorate Mainz – Drususstein (in German)

Buildings and structures in Mainz
Ancient Roman buildings and structures in Germany
Cenotaphs in Germany
Nero Claudius Drusus